146th Division may refer to:

 146th Division (Imperial Japanese Army)
 146th Division (1st Formation)(People's Republic of China)
 146th Division (2nd Formation)(People's Republic of China)